WQTC-FM (102.3 FM, "Classic Rock Q102") is a radio station licensed to Manitowoc, Wisconsin, owned by Seehafer Broadcasting Corporation and serves that community, along with the nearby twin city of Two Rivers and fringe coverage of (though not directly marketing to) Sheboygan. A sister station to WOMT (1240), WQTC-FM broadcasts the satellite format of Dial Global's Classic Rock Network during most programming hours, along with local news and weather cut-ins by WOMT staff and local high school sports, mainly the teams of Two Rivers High School to complement WOMT's coverage of the Manitowoc high school teams.

In 2009, WOMT and WQTC-FM gained another sister station in Cleveland's WLKN-FM (98.1), whose operations moved to Manitowoc on August 31, 2016. In November 2015, Seehafer Broadcasting purchased longtime local competitors WLTU and WCUB.

A minor tweak in the format came in 2013 when WQTC switched from airing Dial Global's Classic Hits network to their Classic Rock network; a converse change of slogan and logo to Classic Rock Q102 was made with the change.

References

External links

QTC-FM
Classic rock radio stations in the United States